The Dobbin Round Barn is a historic building located near State Center in rural Marshall County, Iowa, United States. The true round barn was built in 1919 by Ike Inqersol and Amos Thomson. It features white vertical siding, a two-pitch roof, louvered cupola and a  diameter central silo. The barn has been listed on the National Register of Historic Places since 1986.

References 

Infrastructure completed in 1919
Buildings and structures in Marshall County, Iowa
National Register of Historic Places in Marshall County, Iowa
Barns on the National Register of Historic Places in Iowa
Round barns in Iowa
1919 establishments in Iowa